Where's Waldo? (known outside North America as Where's Wally?) is an American animated children's television series with educational elements based on The Waldo Film Company's 1991 original television series of the same name (produced by DIC Enterprises and HIT Communications) and the characters from the Where's Wally? books by Martin Handford. The series is produced by DreamWorks Animation Television and debuted on Universal Kids on July 20, 2019. It moved to the streaming service Peacock for its second season on July 10, 2020.
Additional episodes of the series aired on December 11 the same year. Other media featuring the titular character include the 1991 original animated television series and the series of books.

Premise
The series follows young members of the WorldWide Wanderer Society, Waldo and Wenda, who are sent on travel missions by their wizard friend, Wizard Whitebeard. Their rival, Odlulu, causes them trouble in their attempts to earn stripes and become wizard-level wanderers.

Cast

Main
 Joshua Rush (US dub) and James Cartmell (UK dub) as Waldo/Wally, a 12-year-old Wanderer and the titular main protagonist in-training.
 Haley Tju (US dub) and Erin Austen (UK dub) as Wenda, a junior-level Wanderer and Waldo's best friend. Unlike her previous incarnations, she is dark-skinned and does not wear glasses; she also has a different outfit design.
 Eva Carlton (US dub) and Hannah Hutch (UK dub) as Odlulu, an Anti-Wanderer and the main antagonist who used to be in the WorldWide Wanderer Society. She is a genderbend version of Odlaw, Waldo's original arch-nemesis.
 Thomas Lennon (US dub) and Adam Diggle (UK dub) as Wizard Whitebeard, a wizard-level Wanderer and a mentor to Waldo and Wenda.
 Piotr Michael (US dub) and Owen Crouch (UK dub) as Fritz, Odlulu's ferret sidekick.
 Michael also voices Arfolomew and Additional Voices

Recurring and guest
 Bobby Moynihan as Wizard Wavybeard
 Retta as Wizard Nightingale 
 Oscar Nunez as Wizard Featherbeard 
 Tom Kenny as Wizard Blizzardbeard And Various 
 Al Yankovic as Wizard Artbeard 
 Kerri Kenney-Silver as Wizard Lariat 
 Danielle Pinnock as Wizard Doubloon 
 Rachel Dratch as Wizard Fix-it 
 Chris Sullivan as Santa Claus
 Carlos Alazraqui as Wizard Vinebeard 
 Hannah Simone as Wizard Odissi 
 Cedric Yarbrough as Wizard Dustybeard 
 Sumalee Montano as Wizard Flambé 
 Randall Park as Wizard Shadowbeard 
 Nichole Bloom as Wizard Amber
 Rob Riggle as Wizard Rockybeard 
 Stephanie Beatriz as Wizard Melodia
 Cheri Oteri as Wizard Corriedale
 Jerry O'Connell as Jason
 Henry Winkler as Wizard Longbeard

Episodes

Series overview

Season 1 (2019)

Season 2 (2020-21)

Broadcast
Where's Waldo? aired on Universal Kids in the United States, but the series moved to Peacock in 2020. The series also premiered in British in 2020: on Sky Kids in United Kingdom on March 3 and Sky One on April 4. The same year, the first 12 episodes of Where's Waldo? premiered first on the DreamWorks Channel in Southeast Asia (specifically for Hong Kong, Indonesia, Malaysia, Maldives, Myanmar, the Philippines, Pakistan, Singapore, South Korea, and Taiwan). In 2021, the series premiered in Italian on Rai Gulp in Italy, in Spanish on Clan in Spain, in German on Super RTL in Germany and in English on e.tv in South Africa.

Production
Where's Waldo? was in the production of DreamWorks Animation Television in 2018. The series debuted on Universal Kids along with 8 other DreamWorks Animation series, premiering on July 20, 2019. A UK version of the show with the name Where's Wally? was produced in which James Cartmell voiced Wally/Waldo.

References

External links
 

2010s American animated television series
2020s American animated television series
Animated television series reboots
2019 American television series debuts
2021 American television series endings
American children's animated adventure television series
American children's animated comedy television series
American children's animated education television series
American children's animated mystery television series
American television shows based on children's books
Animated television series about children
American flash animated television series
DreamWorks Classics
English-language television shows
Television series by DreamWorks Animation
Television series by Universal Television
Universal Kids original programming
Self-censorship
Where's Wally?
Peacock (streaming service) original programming
Peacock (streaming service) children's programming